Shamshuddin Jumadeen (born 19 March 1959) is a Trinidadian cricketer. He played in fourteen first-class and two List A matches for Trinidad and Tobago from 1976 to 1983.

See also
 List of Trinidadian representative cricketers

References

External links
 

1959 births
Living people
Trinidad and Tobago cricketers